Rocky Elsom (born 14 February 1983) is a former Australian rugby union player. He played the positions of flanker and number eight. He was selected for 75 caps for Australia. He is the most capped Australian blindside flanker. Elsom was the 76th Australian test captain, having replaced Stirling Mortlock in 2009 for two years. He played for the Wallabies from 2005 until 2011. Elsom played professionally for New South Wales, Brumbies and Leinster.

Elsom is one of Australia's most decorated players, having won Herald Super 14 player of the year in 2007, Wallaby of the Year in 2008, European Player of the Year in 2009 and having been inducted into the European Cup Hall of Fame in 2010. He also holds the record for most tries by a Wallaby forward and is one of only a handful of Australians to win a Heineken Cup medal twice. Brian O'Driscoll once lauded Elsom as the best player in the world.

Elsom's post-playing rugby career started in spectacular fashion, taking over RCNM Racing Club Narbonne Mediterranean in 2013. RCNM's 2013/14 season, Elsom's first at the 110-year-old club, broke every major record in the club's history, except for highest individual point scorer and according to the LNR, occurred with the lowest player spend and lowest central funding in the league.
Elsom's low-cost, lightly-staffed, profitable model attracted the attention of the Qatar Investment Fund, with RCNM being pursued by its Chairman & CEO in 2015.

Career
Elsom has had an international career spanning 75 matches along with 64 Super Rugby Caps and 21 caps for Dublin-based province Leinster. In his career Elsom has won NSW Waratah of the Year 2007, Herald Super 14 Player of the Year, Wallaby of the Year, Leinster Rugby Player of the Year, Magners League Player of the Year and European Player of the Year. In 2010 Elsom was named at blindside flanker in a European dream team by the ERC to celebrate the fifteenth anniversary of the Heineken Cup. This came despite him only spending one season with Leinster, such was his impact during the tournament that year. Elsom was also awarded the Waratah Medal for outstanding contribution to NSW Rugby in 2007. Elsom is one of only a handful of Australian players that have won a European Cup. Elsom's career has not been without controversy, with a couple of suspensions (one of which was later overturned). Also a drawn-out feud with the ARU over the terms of his contract led to an unusual early release on 'compassionate grounds' to join Leinster in 2008. This resulted in Elsom being deemed 'unavailable' for the 2008 Wallaby Spring tour despite being named Wallaby of the Year one month earlier. Ten days after a 'Man of the Match' performance in Leinster's victory in the 2009 Heineken Cup Final against Leicester Tigers, Elsom negotiated a return to Australia and the test arena, agreeing to terms with the ARU and ACT Brumbies.

Early career
Elsom was born in Melbourne and was educated at St. Joseph's Nudgee College in Brisbane where he was captain of the rugby union side; he went on to make the Australian Schoolboys side. He was a fast, agile forward for a young man of his size. He was nearly 100 kg when he finished in the Australian Schoolboys side. He was selected to play number 8 for the Australian Schoolboys in August 2000.

Rugby League
Following Elsom's success on the schoolboy stage, he spent two seasons with the Canterbury Bulldogs rugby league club in Sydney and was a front-row prop in their 2001 premiership-winning Jersey Flegg Cup side. During that time he lived with fellow Bulldogs players including future test star Johnathan Thurston, Nate Myles, Roy Asotasi and dual-code international, Sonny Bill Williams, whom he would go on to meet on two occasions at test level in rugby union. They resided in a Bulldogs-owned cottage called the 'Dog House' in Belmore.

Waratahs & Australia

Elsom returned to rugby union in 2003, making his debut in Super Rugby against the Auckland Blues for the Waratahs. He also co-captained the Australian Under 21s at the 2003 under-21 World Cup.

Elsom continued to progress in the Australian rugby scene, featuring in 12 of the Waratahs 13 games during the 2005 season, which saw the side make it to the final, only to be defeated by the Crusaders. Elsom was selected as number six for the opening Wallaby test of 2005 against Samoa. He scored the opening try of the match and went on to hold his place as Australia's first choice number six despite strong competition. In 2005, Elsom re-signed with the Waratahs, which saw him stay at the New South Wales franchise until the end of the 2008 Super 14 season.

In 2007, Elsom was named captain of the Waratahs for their week 12 clash with the Highlanders in Sydney, his 50th appearance for the Waratahs. Elsom also received the Matt Burke Cup for the Waratahs in 2007 along with the Herald Award for the best performing Super 14 player of 2007 and the NSW Medal for outstanding contribution to NSW rugby. He was also named the most valuable flanker in Australia. In his world cup debut against Japan, he scored a hat-trick of tries and set a world record for the fastest hat-trick by a forward in World Cup history (18.33 minutes). In late 2007 Elsom played Number Eight in the Barbarians VS.  match, where he scored an unforgettable try early in the second half which helped the Barbarians push past the World Champions South Africa.

In 2008 Elsom was awarded the 'Wallaby of the Year' after playing in all but one match of the Wallaby's Tri-nations tests and scoring a crucial try to defeat the All Blacks in Sydney. That year, Elsom signed a one-year deal with Irish provincial side Leinster to join them in September 2008.

Leinster
Elsom moved to Leinster Rugby in 2008, with a view to competing in the 2008/09 Heineken Cup. He was instrumental in Leinster winning their first title, awarded man of the match in two of the three playoff games, including the final, where he was credited with inspiring the pack to a 19–16 victory over the Leicester Tigers.

In 2009 Elsom was awarded 'Leinster Rugby Player of the Year', winning an unprecedented 70% of the popular vote. He was also voted 'European Player of the Year 2008/09', after Leinster won the Heineken Cup with three Man of the Match performances from Leinster's six wins. In the Magners League, Elsom picked up 11 Man of the Match awards from his last 13 outings and was judged the 'Magners League Player of the Year 2008/9', as well as being included in both Celtic and European 'Dream Teams' along with fellow Leinster player Brian O'Driscoll.  So popular did Elsom become during his time with Leinster, that the fans developed a 'Rocky' chant, taken from the Rocky films, which they rolled out every time the Australian flanker appeared in Leinster colours.

Elsom was a massive physical presence in the pack, consistently breaking top level tackles. In May 2009, Elsom was named in the Barbarians squad to play England and Australia along with Leinster colleagues Gordon D'Arcy and Chris Whitaker.

Return to Australia
In June 2009 Elsom signed a two-year contract with the ACT Brumbies, citing his desire to resume his international career with the Wallabies as the deciding factor in his decision. Elsom joined the CA Brumbies in 2010 on a two-year contract but injuries restricted him to 13 appearances.

Elsom was picked in the 45-man squad to tour Britain and Ireland in November 2009, and became Australia's 76th test captain, replacing Stirling Mortlock. At the end of the tour, his captaincy record for the Wallabies stood at two wins (against England and Wales), two losses (against New Zealand and Scotland), and a draw against Ireland in which he scored a try at the 60th minute to put his team back in front.

In the first Bledisloe Cup Match of 2010, Elsom captained his side to a defeat, where the Wallabies managed to put 28 points on the All Blacks with only 14 men for more than 50 minutes of the game after Drew Mitchell was controversially sent off. Elsom himself scored the last try for the Wallabies. He agreed to rejoin the NSW Waratahs on a one-year deal.

In 2013, Elsom signed with French Top 14 giants Toulon, following his release from the Waratahs and a prolonged legal battle with Japanese Top League with Kobe Steelers.

Post-playing career
Elsom is currently a major shareholder of French ProD2 team RC Narbonne, and is implementing a World Class S&C program as well as innovating in recruitment, preparation and development of better Rugby players.

Controversies
In March 2006, Elsom was suspended for four weeks for fighting with South African Prop Jaco Engels. The incident was in retaliation to Engels joining a fight between NSW Prop Matt Dunning and Richard Bands in a Super 12 Match in Pretoria. Englis and Dunning received 1 and 3 weeks suspension for their part in the incident, while Elsom's heftier ban was justified by repeated blows to the head of an opponent.

In late 2008, Elsom retaliated to Connacht lock Mike McCarthy after he had been head-butted, throwing a punch at McCarthy's head despite being held back by several Leinster and Connacht players. Elsom was yellow carded and McCarthy was red carded, because he had already been sin binned previously in the game.

Honours

Leinster
Heineken Cup: 2008/09

References

External links
 Wallabies profile
 Leinster profile
 Waratahs profile
 itsrugby.co.uk profile

1983 births
Living people
Australia international rugby union players
Australian expatriate rugby union players
Australian expatriate sportspeople in France
Australian expatriate sportspeople in Ireland
Australian expatriate sportspeople in Japan
Australian rugby league players
Australian rugby union captains
Australian rugby union players
ACT Brumbies players
Expatriate rugby union players in France
Expatriate rugby union players in Ireland
Expatriate rugby union players in Japan
Kobelco Kobe Steelers players
Leinster Rugby players
New South Wales Waratahs players
Rugby union flankers
Rugby union players from Melbourne
People educated at St Joseph's College, Nudgee